Andrew Stewart (June 11, 1791 – July 16, 1872) was a member of the U.S. House of Representatives from Pennsylvania.

Andrew Stewart (father of Andrew Stewart) was born near Uniontown, Pennsylvania.  He graduated from Washington College (now Washington & Jefferson College) in Washington, Pennsylvania.  He was one of the founders of the Union Literary Society at Washington College.  He studied law, was admitted to the bar in 1815 and commenced practice in Uniontown.  He was a member of the Pennsylvania House of Representatives from 1815 to 1818.  He was appointed by President James Monroe as the first U.S. District Attorney for the newly created United States District Court for the Western District of Pennsylvania based in Pittsburgh, serving until 1821.

Stewart was elected as a Democratic-Republican  to the Seventeenth Congress, reelected as a Jackson Republican to the Eighteenth Congress, elected as a Jacksonian to the Nineteenth Congress, and reelected as an Adams candidate to the Twentieth Congress.  He was elected as an Anti-Masonic candidate to the Twenty-second and Twenty-third Congresses.  He was an unsuccessful candidate for reelection in 1834.

Stewart was elected as a Whig to the Twenty-eighth, Twenty-ninth, and Thirtieth Congresses.  He served as chairman of the United States House Committee on Manufactures during the Thirtieth Congress.  In 1848 he declined to be a candidate for renomination.

He was runner-up to Millard Fillmore for the vice presidential nomination at the 1848 Whig National Convention.  The Whig ticket was successful, and Fillmore ascended to the Presidency when Taylor died, meaning that Stewart was nearly President.

He was affiliated with the Republican Party, and was a delegate at the 1860 Republican National Convention.  He was an unsuccessful candidate for election in 1870.  He was largely interested in building and real estate until his death in Uniontown.  He was interred in Union Cemetery.

Sources

The Political Graveyard

References

External links

 

1791 births
1872 deaths
People from Uniontown, Pennsylvania
Pennsylvania National Republicans
Anti-Masonic Party members of the United States House of Representatives from Pennsylvania
Pennsylvania Whigs
Pennsylvania Republicans
Democratic-Republican Party members of the United States House of Representatives from Pennsylvania
Jacksonian members of the United States House of Representatives from Pennsylvania
19th-century American politicians
National Republican Party members of the United States House of Representatives
Whig Party members of the United States House of Representatives
United States Attorneys for the Western District of Pennsylvania
Washington & Jefferson College alumni